The ruins of the Church of San Martín de Tours in the old village of Belchite in Zaragoza, Spain
are a cultural property of a historical place indexed in the Spanish heritage register of Bienes de Interés Cultural under the reference RI-54-0000176.  It was built in 1560. The ruins remain a national monument and memorial to the Battle of Belchite. In the battle the church was destroyed. Franco ordered that the ruins be left untouched as a "living" monument of war.

References 

Demolished buildings and structures in Zaragoza
Isabelline architecture
Former churches in Spain
Buildings and structures demolished in 1937
1937 disestablishments in Spain
Roman Catholic churches completed in 1560